The United States of America, represented by the United States Olympic Committee (USOC), competed at the 2012 Summer Olympics in London, from July 27 to August 12, 2012. U.S. athletes have competed at every Summer Olympic Games in the modern era, except the 1980 Summer Olympics in Moscow which they boycotted in protest of the Soviet invasion of Afghanistan. The USOC sent a total of 530 athletes to the Games, 262 men and 268 women, to compete in 25 sports. For the first time in its Olympic history, the United States was represented by more female than male athletes.

U.S. athletes left London with a total of 104 medals (46 gold, 28 silver and 30 bronze), finishing at the top of the gold and overall medal standings. The 46-gold medal record was the most the United States had ever won in any Olympics in which it was not the host nation. At least one medal was awarded to U.S. athletes in sixteen sports, thirteen of which contained at least one gold. U.S. athletes dominated the nations' medal standings in swimming, wherein they won a total of 31 medals, including 16 golds. Twenty-seven U.S. athletes won more than a single medal. The U.S. team-based athletes also proved particularly successful, as the women's soccer, water polo, and volleyball teams won gold and silver medals, respectively. Furthermore, the men's and women's basketball teams managed to defend their titles from Beijing. For the first time since 1936, no U.S. athlete won an Olympic medal in sailing.

Among the nation's medalists were swimmers Missy Franklin, Allison Schmitt and Ryan Lochte, who each won a total of five medals. Swimmer Nathan Adrian and platform diver David Boudia won gold medals in their respective individual events after 24-year-long non-successes. Meanwhile, tennis player Serena Williams followed her sister's success by winning the gold medal in the women's tennis singles event. Gymnast Gabby Douglas became the fourth U.S. female to win a gold medal in the individual all-around event. Allyson Felix became the most successful U.S. track-and-field athlete at the event, winning three gold medals. Swimmer Michael Phelps emerged as the most decorated athlete in Olympic history, with a total of 22 medals won (including four gold and two silver medals in London) – 18 gold, 2 silver and 2 bronze medals – surpassing Larisa Latynina's overall Olympic medal count.

After the disqualification of Russian Ivan Ukhov for doping, Erik Kynard has finally got upgraded from silver to gold, which makes it the 47th US gold medal at these Games, the best American result in terms of gold medals in the Summer Olympics held outside of the United States. Ten years later, Lashinda Demus was promoted to the gold medal as well after another Russian, Natalya Antyukh, was found guilty of doping, bringing the total to 48 gold medals.

Medalists

The following U.S. competitors won medals at the games. In the by discipline sections below, medalists' names are bolded.

|  style="text-align:left; width:78%; vertical-align:top;"|

|  style="text-align:left; width:22%; vertical-align:top;"|

Competitors
The USOC selected a team of 530 athletes, 261 men and 269 women, to compete in all sports except handball; it was the nation's sixth-largest team sent to the Olympics, but the smallest since 1988. Athletics was the largest team by sport, with a total of 125 competitors.

The U.S. team featured 302 first-time athletes, and 228 returning Olympians to participate in these games. Among the returning Olympians, seven of them had competed at their fifth Olympics (high jumper Amy Acuff, archer Khatuna Lorig, shooters Kimberly Rhode and Emil Milev, indoor volleyballer Danielle Scott-Arruda, and eventing riders Phillip Dutton and Karen O'Connor – the oldest of the team at age 54). Twenty-one athletes made their fourth Olympic appearances, including springboard diver Troy Dumais, track hurdler Angelo Taylor, and beach volleyballers and double-defending champions Kerri Walsh Jennings and Misty May-Treanor. Fifty-seven athletes made their third Olympic appearances, including rifle shooter Matt Emmons, and twins Bob and Mike Bryan in the men's tennis doubles match. One hundred and forty-three athletes were two-time Olympians, including former defending champions Justin Gatlin (athletics) and Anthony Ervin (swimming), who both made their comeback in London after long years of absence. Two hundred and eight returning athletes had competed in Beijing, including 124 Olympic medalists, and 76 defending champions.

Among the nation's defending champions were swimmers Michael Phelps and Natalie Coughlin. Phelps won a historic amount of eight gold medals in Beijing to become the most-decorated Olympic athlete at a single event and the first person to win a total of fourteen Olympic gold medals. Coughlin, on the other hand, won a total of 11 Olympic medals in two previous games, including six gold medals from Beijing. Other notable defending champions featured NBA basketball players Kobe Bryant and LeBron James, who led their team by recapturing the nation's gold medal in Beijing, shooters Walton Eller and Vincent Hancock, road cyclist Kristin Armstrong in women's time trial, and swimmers Rebecca Soni and Ryan Lochte.

First-time Olympians also featured gymnasts Jordyn Wieber and Aly Raisman, decathlete Ashton Eaton, and swimmers Missy Franklin and Katie Ledecky, the youngest of the team at age 15. Former basketball player and five-time Olympic champion Teresa Edwards served as the U.S. team's chef de mission. Double Olympic champion Mariel Zagunis became the third fencer and sixth female athlete to serve as the United States flag bearer at the opening ceremony.

The following is the list of number of competitors participating in the Games. Note that reserves for fencing, field hockey, football and handball are not counted as athletes:

Archery

Three U.S. archers qualified for the men's individual event, three archers for the women's individual event and teams for both the men's team event and women's team event.

Men

Women

Athletics (track and field)

U.S. athletes earned qualifying standards in the following track and field events (up to a maximum of 3 athletes in each event at the 'A' Standard, and 1 at the 'B' Standard): The team was selected based on the results of the 2012 United States Olympic Trials.

Men
Track & road events

Field events

Combined events – Decathlon

Women
Track & road events

Field events

Combined events – Heptathlon

Badminton

The United States will be represented in two out of the five badminton events: men's doubles and women's singles. No US athlete has ever medaled in badminton since it became an Olympic sport in 1992.

Basketball

Summary

Men's tournament

Roster

Group play

Quarterfinal

Semifinal

Gold medal match

Women's tournament

Roster

Group play

Quarterfinal

Semifinal

Gold medal match

Boxing

U.S. boxers qualified for the following events:

Men

* – Spence successfully appealed his initial 11–13 loss. Using video review, AIBA determined the bout referee gave too few cautions for holding fouls and should have awarded Spence at least four more points.

Women

Canoeing

Slalom
U.S. canoeists qualified boats for the following events

Sprint
U.S. canoeists qualified boats in three out of twelve sprint events, one men's and one women's. No U.S. athlete has medaled in Olympic sprint canoeing since 1992.

Cycling

U.S. cyclists qualified for the following events

Road

Men

Women

Track
Sprint

Pursuit

Omnium

Mountain biking

BMX

Diving

U.S. divers qualified for eight individual diving spots at the 2012 Olympic Games. Three US synchronized diving teams qualified through the 2012 FINA Diving World Cup and the rest of the divers qualified for the Olympics through the 2012 U.S. Olympic Trials for diving (quotas themselves were won at the world championships while divers who filled them were selected after the trials)

Men

Women

Equestrian

U.S. equestrians qualified teams in the dressage and eventing team competitions. and also qualified a team in the jumping team competition.

They have also qualified four athletes in the individual dressage competition, five athletes in the individual eventing competition, and four athletes in the individual jumping competition.

Dressage

Eventing

Jumping

Fencing

Twenty U.S. fencers have qualified to compete in all fencing events.

Men

Women

Field hockey

The U.S. women's field hockey team qualified for the Olympics by winning the 2011 Pan American Games. The men's team failed to qualify.

Summary

Women's tournament

Roster

Group play

11th/12th place

Football (soccer)

The U.S. women's soccer team qualified after finishing in first place at the 2012 CONCACAF Women's Olympic Qualifying Tournament. The men's team failed to qualify.

Summary

Women's tournament

Team roster

Group play

Quarter-final

Semi-final

Gold medal match

Gymnastics

Artistic
Men
Team

Individual finals

Women

The women were selected after competing at the Olympic Trials in San Jose, California earlier in the summer.
Team

Individual finals

Rhythmic
One U.S. rhythmic gymnast qualified for the individual all-around competition.

Trampoline
One male and one female gymnast qualified for the trampoline competition.

Judo

Three male and two female U.S. judoka qualified.

Modern pentathlon

Three U.S. athletes qualified to compete in the modern pentathlon event. Dennis Bowsher and Margaux Isaksen qualified through the 2011 Pan American Games.

Rowing

The U.S. rowers qualified the following boats:

Men

Women

Qualification Legend: FA=Final A (medal); FB=Final B (non-medal); FC=Final C (non-medal); FD=Final D (non-medal); FE=Final E (non-medal); FF=Final F (non-medal); SA/B=Semifinals A/B; SC/D=Semifinals C/D; SE/F=Semifinals E/F; QF=Quarterfinals; R=Repechage

Sailing

U.S. sailors qualified one boat for each of the following events.

Men

Women
Fleet racing

Match racing

* – Classification races for 5th through 8th place were cancelled due to lack of wind and round robin standings were used to determine ranks.

Open

Shooting

Twenty U.S. athletes qualified to compete in 13 shooting events.

Men

Women

Swimming

U.S. swimmers earned qualifying standards in the following events (up to a maximum of 2 swimmers in each event at the Olympic Qualifying Time (OQT), and 1 at the Olympic Selection Time (OST)): Swimmers qualified at the 2012 U.S. Olympic Trials (for pool events).

The U.S. swimming team consisted of 49 swimmers (24 men and 25 women).  The oldest swimmer on the team was Jason Lezak at the age of 36 years, and the youngest was Katie Ledecky at the age of 15 years.  The only siblings on the swim team are Haley Anderson and Alyssa Anderson.  USA Swimming named Brendan Hansen, Natalie Coughlin, Peter Vanderkaay, Rebecca Soni, and Lezak as the team's captains.

Men

Qualifiers for the latter rounds (Q) of all events were decided on a time only basis, therefore positions shown are overall results versus competitors in all heats.

Women

Qualifiers for the latter rounds (Q) of all events were decided on a time only basis, therefore positions shown are overall results versus competitors in all heats.
* – Indicates athlete swam in the preliminaries but not in the final race.

Synchronized swimming

One U.S. duet qualified in synchronized swimming.

Table tennis

Three U.S. individual athletes qualified to compete include one male and two females, and a female team.

Taekwondo

Two U.S. male and female taekwondo jin qualified to compete.

Tennis

The United States Tennis Association nominated six male and six female tennis players to compete in the tennis tournament.

Men

Women

Mixed

Triathlon

Two U.S. men and three women qualified to compete in the triathlon event.

Volleyball

Beach

Indoor

Both a U.S. men's and women's volleyball team qualified for the indoor tournaments.

Summary

Men's tournament

Team roster

Group play

Quarter-final

Women's tournament

Team roster

Group play

Quarter-final

Semi-final

Gold medal match

Water polo

The U.S. men's and women's water polo teams qualified by winning the water polo event at the 2011 Pan American Games.

Summary

Men's tournament

Roster

Group play

Quarter-final

5th–8th semi-final

7th/8th place

Women's tournament

Roster

Group play

Quarterfinal

Semifinal

Gold medal match

Weightlifting

Three U.S. weightlifters qualified to compete.

Wrestling

The U.S. wrestlers qualified to compete in all events except the 96 kg Greco-Roman classification.

Men's freestyle

Men's Greco-Roman

Women's freestyle

Uniform controversy
The 2012 US Olympic team uniforms for opening ceremony of the London Olympics were designed by Ralph Lauren, but were manufactured in China, setting off a bipartisan backlash from the United States Congress protesting US manufacturing not being showcased by the US Olympic athletes.

On July 13, 2012, six Democratic U.S. senators announced they had co-sponsored legislation to require the 2012 U.S. Olympic team to wear US-made uniforms. The co-sponsors of the "Team USA Made In America Act of 2012" are Senators Robert Menendez and Frank R. Lautenberg, both of New Jersey, Bob Casey of Pennsylvania, Sherrod Brown of Ohio, and Charles E. Schumer and Kirsten Gillibrand of New York.

Due to uniform controversy for the summer games, on July 13, 2012, The U.S. Olympic Committee stated that the uniforms for the opening and closing ceremonies at the 2014 Winter Olympics, in Sochi, Russia, will be made in the United States.

See also
United States at the 2011 Pan American Games
United States at the 2012 Winter Youth Olympics
United States at the 2012 Summer Paralympics

References

External links

 Official website of the United States Olympic Committee and Team USA
 NBC Olympics Coverage

Nations at the 2012 Summer Olympics
2012
Summer Olympics